Rachel and Stephen Kaplan are professors of psychology at the University of Michigan, specializing in environmental psychology. The Kaplans are known for their research on the effect of nature on people's relationships and health.

About 
Their work on "restorative environments" and Attention Restoration Theory influenced how landscape and design professionals and others view humanity's relationship with nature. The Kaplans got involved in studying the effects of nature on people in the 1970s with a US Forest Service grant to evaluate a challenge program in Michigan's wilderness. This introduction went on to influence generations of environmental psychologists and designers.

The Kaplans have found that too much focused attention on anything can lead to mental fatigue and such fatigue's remedy is found in exposure to nature. In order for nature to best work its relaxing effect it is preferable for a place to have a high fascination value. An environment that automatically pulls the viewer into it is most beneficial. The Kaplans' research has found that office workers with a view of nature were happier and healthier at work. Exposure to natural environments of the most mundane sort has proven to lift people's moods and enhance their ability to mentally focus.

Recent research of the Kaplans has also shown that people who exercise by walking outside in pleasant environments tend to walk longer than those who walk inside or around their neighborhoods.

Bibliography

Rachel and Stephen Kaplan

Rachel Kaplan

Stephen Kaplan

See also

 Attention Restoration Theory

References

Environmental psychologists
University of Michigan faculty